was a Japanese reporter, anarchist and critic born in Tokyo. He was the son of the artist and activist Eitarō Takenaka. Expelled from the Russian language department of the Tokyo University of Foreign Studies, he went on to write about various subjects in the worlds of politics and culture under the pseudonyms "Yumeno Kyōtarō," "Kenka Takenaka" and "Hankotsu-no-Reporter" (literally: "Rebellious Reporter") among others. He also wrote several books on Japanese film history. In his final years he continued his journalistic activities, despite suffering from and ultimately dying of cancer.

References

1930 births
1991 deaths
People from Tokyo
Japanese anarchists
Japanese film critics
Japanese journalists
Mystery Writers of Japan Award winners
20th-century journalists